Actinoposthiidae is a family of acoels.

Taxonomy

Genera
The following genera are recognised in the family Actinoposthiidae:

 Actinoposthia An der Lan, 1936
 Archactinoposthia Dörjes, 1968
 Atriofronta Dörjes, 1968
 Childianea Faubel & Cameron, 2001
 Microposthia  Faubel, 1974
 Paractinoposthia Ehlers & Dörjes, 1981
 Paraproporus Westblad, 1945
 Pseudactinoposthia Dörjes, 1968
 Tetraposthia An der Lan, 1936

Species
There are 21 species recognised in the family Actinoposthiidae.

Notes

References

External Sites

Acoelomorphs